Sri Ramulu or Sreeramulu is an Indian name, a variant of the name Ram. It may refer to: 

 B. Sriramulu, Indian politician
 Potti Sreeramulu, an Indian revolutionary